The 1974–75 Seattle SuperSonics season was the 8th season of the Seattle SuperSonics in the National Basketball Association (NBA). In their second season with Bill Russell as head coach and with rookies comprising half the roster, the SuperSonics finished the regular season in 4th place in the Western Conference with a 43–39 record and reached the playoffs for the first time in franchise history. After defeating the Detroit Pistons in three games in the first round in a best-of-three series, the team fell to the eventual NBA champions Golden State Warriors in six games.

Offseason
Head coach Bill Russell anticipated a roster overhaul during the offseason. After trading Dick Snyder on draft day to the Cleveland Cavaliers in exchange of the Cavs' first round selection, the SuperSonics selected center Tommy Burleson with the 3rd overall pick.

Draft picks

Note: only draft picks who participated in at least one game in the NBA are listed.

Roster

Regular season

Season standings

z – clinched division title
y – clinched division title
x – clinched playoff spot

Record vs. opponents

Game log

|-bgcolor=#fcc
| 1
| October 17
| @ Phoenix
| L 97–114
| Archie Clark (27)
| || || Arizona Veterans Memorial Coliseum7,215 || 0–1

|-bgcolor=#fcc
| 2
| October 18
| Detroit
| L 95–100
| Spencer Haywood (23)
| || || Seattle Center Coliseum9,537 || 0–2

|-bgcolor=#cfc
| 3
| October 20
| Cleveland
| W 100–93
| Fred Brown (31)
| || || Seattle Center Coliseum10,241 || 1–2

|-bgcolor=#cfc
| 4
| October 23
| Portland
| W 107–97
| Archie Clark (19)
| || || Seattle Center Coliseum13,283 || 2–2

|-bgcolor=#cfc
| 5
| October 25
| Phoenix
| W 106–97
| Spencer Haywood (27)
| || || Seattle Center Coliseum12,191 || 3–2

|-bgcolor=#fcc
| 6
| October 27
| @ Portland
| L 94–120
| Fred Brown (32)
| || || Memorial Coliseum10,870 || 3–3

|-bgcolor=#cfc
| 7
| October 30
| Los Angeles
| W 117–97
| Spencer Haywood (40)
| || || Seattle Center Coliseum8,938 || 4–3

|-bgcolor=#fcc
| 8
| November 1
| Golden State
| L 88–99
| Spencer Haywood (28)
| || || Seattle Center Coliseum12,777 || 4–4

|-bgcolor=#cfc
| 9
| November 3
| Milwaukee
| W 101–89
| Fred Brown (28)
| || || Seattle Center Coliseum11,839 || 5–4

|-bgcolor=#cfc
| 10
| November 7
| @ Golden State
| W 104–93
| Fred Brown (31)
| || || Oakland–Alameda County Coliseum Arena5,391 || 6–4

|-bgcolor=#cfc
| 11
| November 10
| Philadelphia
| W 109–95
| Spencer Haywood (27)
| || || Seattle Center Coliseum12,825 || 7–4

|-bgcolor=#cfc
| 12
| November 13
| Los Angeles
| W 108–103
| Spencer Haywood (24)
| || || Seattle Center Coliseum13,004 || 8–4

|-bgcolor=#fcc
| 13
| November 15
| @ Detroit
| L 103–117
| Archie Clark (25)
| || || Cobo Arena6,789 || 8–5

|-bgcolor=#fcc
| 14
| November 16
| @ New York
| L 94–104
| Spencer Haywood (34)
| || || Madison Square Garden18,932 || 8–6

|-bgcolor=#fcc
| 15
| November 19
| @ Atlanta
| L 113–122
| Spencer Haywood (31)
| || || Omni Coliseum3,769 || 8–7

|-bgcolor=#cfc
| 16
| November 20
| @ New Orleans
| W 99–95
| Three players (18)
| || || Municipal Auditorium4,318 || 9–7

|-bgcolor=#fcc
| 17
| November 22
| Chicago
| L 89–93
| Spencer Haywood (32)
| || || Seattle Center Coliseum14,082 || 9–8

|-bgcolor=#cfc
| 18
| November 23
| @ Portland
| W 117–110
| Fred Brown (40)
| || || Memorial Coliseum11,825 || 10–8

|-bgcolor=#fcc
| 19
| November 24
| Houston
| L 109–124
| Spencer Haywood (30)
| || || Seattle Center Coliseum14,082 || 10–9

|-bgcolor=#fcc
| 20
| November 26
| @ Cleveland
| L 94–102
| Spencer Haywood (29)
| || || Coliseum at Richfield4,537 || 10–10

|-bgcolor=#fcc
| 21
| November 27
| @ Boston
| L 99–104
| Fred Brown (29)
| || || Boston Garden10,543 || 10–11

|-bgcolor=#cfc
| 22
| November 29
| @ Philadelphia
| W 121–119 (OT)
| Fred Brown (40)
| || || The Spectrum8,660 || 11–11

|-bgcolor=#fcc
| 23
| November 30
| @ Washington
| L 90–122
| Archie Clark (23)
| || || Capital Centre8,865 || 11–12

|-bgcolor=#cfc
| 24
| December 2
| @ Kansas City-Omaha
| W 110–106
| Spencer Haywood (26)
| || || Omaha Civic Auditorium4,721 || 12–12

|-bgcolor=#cfc
| 25
| December 4
| @ Milwaukee
| W 112–103
| Spencer Haywood (37)
| || || MECCA Arena10,497 || 13–12

|-bgcolor=#cfc
| 26
| December 6
| New Orleans
| W 121–108
| james (22)
| || || Seattle Center Coliseum14,082 || 14–12

|-bgcolor=#fcc
| 27
| December 7
| @ Golden State
| L 96–132
| Spencer Haywood (20)
| || || Oakland–Alameda County Coliseum Arena12,608 || 14–13

|-bgcolor=#fcc
| 28
| December 8
| Atlanta
| L 95–102
| Spencer Haywood (18)
| || || Seattle Center Coliseum11,575 || 14–14

|-bgcolor=#fcc
| 29
| December 11
| Cleveland
| L 95–97
| Archie Clark (22)
| || || Seattle Center Coliseum10,033 || 14–15

|-bgcolor=#fcc
| 30
| December 13
| @ Los Angeles
| L  93–109
| Fred Brown (16)
| || || The Forum10,296 || 14–16

|-bgcolor=#fcc
| 31
| December 17
| @ Chicago
| L 84–87
| Fred Brown (23)
| || || Chicago Stadium5,591 || 14–17

|-bgcolor=#cfc
| 32
| December 18
| @ Detroit
| W 100–97
| Fred Brown (34)
| || || Cobo Arena4,365 || 15–17

|-bgcolor=#cfc
| 33
| December 22
| Detroit
| W 108–90
| Rowe (22)
| || || Seattle Center Coliseum13,346 || 16–17

|-bgcolor=#fcc
| 34
| December 27
| Kansas City-Omaha
| L 98–108
| Fred Brown (37)
| || || Seattle Center Coliseum13,260 || 16–18

|-bgcolor=#fcc
| 35
| December 29
| Boston
| L 101–121
| Spencer Haywood (30)
| || || Seattle Center Coliseum14,082 || 16–19

|-bgcolor=#cfc
| 36
| January 1
| Washington
| W 123–118 (OT)
| Spencer Haywood (32)
| || || Seattle Center Coliseum12,363 || 17–19

|-bgcolor=#cfc
| 37
| January 3
| @ Portland
| W 98–93
| Fred Brown (32)
| || || Memorial Coliseum10,695 || 18–19

|-bgcolor=#cfc
| 38
| January 4
| New Orleans
| W 111–89
| Spencer Haywood (20)
| || || Seattle Center Coliseum13,474 || 19–19

|-bgcolor=#fcc
| 39
| January 8
| New York
| L 102–113
| Spencer Haywood (38)
| || || Seattle Center Coliseum13,203 || 19–20

|-bgcolor=#fcc
| 40
| January 10
| Golden State
| L 94–119
| Fred Brown (27)
| || || Seattle Center Coliseum14,055 || 19–21

|-bgcolor=#fcc
| 41
| January 12
| Chicago
| L 123–127 (2OT)
| Fred Brown, Spencer Haywood (24)
| || || Seattle Center Coliseum14,082 || 19–22

|-bgcolor=#cfc
| 42
| January 16
| @ Houston
| W 127–125 (OT)
| Fred Brown (36)
| || || Hofheinz Pavilion2,274 || 20–22

|-bgcolor=#fcc
| 43
| January 17
| @ New Orleans
| L 109–113
| Jim Fox (28)
| || || Municipal Auditorium3,120 || 20–23

|-bgcolor=#fcc
| 44
| January 19
| @ Atlanta
| L 109–117
| Fred Brown (22)
| || || Omni Coliseum5,651 || 20–24

|-bgcolor=#fcc
| 45
| January 21
| @ Buffalo
| L 108–118
| jackson (18)
| || || Buffalo Memorial Auditorium10,271 || 20–25

|-bgcolor=#fcc
| 46
| January 24
| @ Chicago
| L 81–86
| Fred Brown (24)
| || || Chicago Stadium7,107 || 20–26

|-bgcolor=#cfc
| 47
| January 26
| @ Cleveland
| W 96–93
| Fred Brown, Tommy Burleson (21)
| || || Coliseum at Richfield4,219 || 21–26

|-bgcolor=#cfc
| 48
| January 29
| @ Phoenix
| W 99–85
| Fred Brown (24)
| || || Arizona Veterans Memorial Coliseum4,273 || 22–26

|-bgcolor=#cfc
| 49
| January 31
| Portland
| W 106–103
| John Brisker (28)
| || || Seattle Center Coliseum14,082 || 23–26

|-bgcolor=#cfc
| 50
| February 1
| @ Portland
| W 93–91
| Fred Brown (28)
| || || Memorial Coliseum11,870 || 24–26

|-bgcolor=#cfc
| 51
| February 2
| @ Los Angeles
| W 119–112
| Archie Clark (22)
| || || The Forum11,586 || 25–26

|-bgcolor=#fcc
| 52
| February 5
| Phoenix
| L 102–107
| Fred Brown (18)
| || || Seattle Center Coliseum10,002 || 25–27

|-bgcolor=#fcc
| 53
| February 6
| @ Phoenix
| L 105–112
| Fred Brown (36)
| || || Arizona Veterans Memorial Coliseum5,865 || 25–28

|-bgcolor=#fcc
| 54
| February 7
| Washington
| L 76–99
| Spencer Haywood (22)
| || || Seattle Center Coliseum12,720 || 25–29

|-bgcolor=#fcc
| 55
| February 9
| Buffalo
| L 93–99 (OT)
| Spencer Haywood (29)
| || || Seattle Center Coliseum11,082 || 25–30

|-bgcolor=#cfc
| 56
| February 12
| Houston
| W 104–103
| Spencer Haywood (31)
| || || Seattle Center Coliseum8,595 || 26–30

|-bgcolor=#fcc
| 57
| February 14
| @ Portland
| L 88–90
| Spencer Haywood (23)
| || || Memorial Coliseum11,885 || 26–31

|-bgcolor=#cfc
| 58
| February 16
| Los Angeles
| W 109–87
| Spencer Haywood (24)
| || || Seattle Center Coliseum12,053 || 27–31

|-bgcolor=#cfc
| 59
| February 19
| Boston
| W 121–95
| Tommy Burleson (28)
| || || Seattle Center Coliseum13,680 || 28–31

|-bgcolor=#cfc
| 60
| February 21
| Atlanta
| W 110–108
| Spencer Haywood (39)
| || || Seattle Center Coliseum14,082 || 29–31

|-bgcolor=#fcc
| 61
| February 23
| Philadelphia
| L 100–114
| Fred Brown (25)
| || || Seattle Center Coliseum12,871 || 29–32

|-bgcolor=#cfc
| 62
| February 25
| @ New York
| W 102–101
| Spencer Haywood (37)
| || || Madison Square Garden17,096 || 30–32

|-bgcolor=#fcc
| 63
| February 26
| @ Washington
| L 98–104
| Spencer Haywood (20)
| || || Capital Centre6,202 || 30–33

|-bgcolor=#fcc
| 64
| February 28
| @ Philadelphia
| L 111–112
| Spencer Haywood (32)
| || || The Spectrum7,682 || 30–34

|-bgcolor=#cfc
| 65
| March 2
| @ Boston
| W 104–97
| Spencer Haywood (30)
| || || Hartford, CT11,283 || 31–34

|-bgcolor=#fcc
| 66
| March 4
| @ Buffalo
| L 97–104
| Leonard Gray (33)
| || || Buffalo Memorial Auditorium12,665 || 31–35

|-bgcolor=#fcc
| 67
| March 6
| @ Milwaukee
| L 92–102
| Fred Brown (25)
| || || MECCA Arena10,938 || 31–36

|-bgcolor=#cfc
| 68
| March 8
| @ Kansas City-Omaha
| W 103–99
| Fred Brown (24)
| || || Municipal Auditorium12,389 || 32–36

|-bgcolor=#cfc
| 69
| March 11
| @ Houston
| W 122–117 (OT)
| Leonard Gray (25)
| || || Hofheinz Pavilion6,153 || 33–36

|-bgcolor=#cfc
| 70
| March 14
| Buffalo
| W 125–105
| Tommy Burleson, Spencer Haywood (22)
| || || Seattle Center Coliseum14,082 || 34–36

|-bgcolor=#fcc
| 71
| March 15
| @ Golden State
| L 84–120
| Fred Brown (23)
| || || Oakland–Alameda County Coliseum Arena9,594 || 34–37

|-bgcolor=#cfc
| 72
| March 16
| New York
| W 97–94
| Fred Brown (37)
| || || Seattle Center Coliseum14,082 || 35–37

|-bgcolor=#cfc
| 73
| March 19
| Milwaukee
| W 101–100
| Leonard Gray (20)
| || || Seattle Center Coliseum14,082 || 36–37

|-bgcolor=#fcc
| 74
| March 21
| @ Los Angeles
| L 109–112 (OT)
| Archie Clark (29)
| || || The Forum10,102 || 36–38

|-bgcolor=#fcc
| 75
| March 23
| Phoenix
| L 96–102
| Spencer Haywood (23)
| || || Seattle Center Coliseum14,082 || 36–39

|-bgcolor=#cfc
| 76
| March 26
| Los Angeles
| W 110–89
| Archie Clark (24)
| || || Seattle Center Coliseum12,128 || 37–39

|-bgcolor=#cfc
| 77
| March 28
| Golden State
| W 96–92
| Tommy Burleson (22)
| || || Seattle Center Coliseum14,082 || 38–39

|-bgcolor=#cfc
| 78
| March 30
| Portland
| W 98–88
| Spencer Haywood (40)
| || || Seattle Center Coliseum14,082 || 39–39

|-bgcolor=#cfc
| 79
| April 2
| Kansas City-Omaha
| W 99–96
| Spencer Haywood (25)
| || || Seattle Center Coliseum13,628 || 40–39

|-bgcolor=#cfc
| 80
| April 4
| @ Los Angeles
| W 111–102
| Tommy Burleson (25)
| || || The Forum10,946 || 41–39

|-bgcolor=#cfc
| 81
| April 5
| @ Golden State
| W 109–108
| Tommy Burleson (26)
| || || Oakland–Alameda County Coliseum Arena11,064 || 42–39

|-bgcolor=#cfc
| 82
| April 6
| Phoenix
| W 114–111
| Archie Clark (31)
| || || Seattle Center Coliseum14,082 || 43–39

Playoffs

|- align="center" bgcolor="#ccffcc"
| 1
| April 8
| Detroit
| W 90–77
| Fred Brown (23)
| Spencer Haywood (14)
| Slick Watts (6)
| Seattle Center Coliseum14,082
| 1–0
|- align="center" bgcolor="#ffcccc"
| 2
| April 10
| @ Detroit
| L 106–122
| Fred Brown (30)
| Tommy Burleson (10)
| Slick Watts (8)
| Cobo Arena10,490
| 1–1
|- align="center" bgcolor="#ccffcc"
| 3
| April 12
| Detroit
| W 100–93
| Tommy Burleson (23)
| Tommy Burleson (16)
| Slick Watts (6)
| Seattle Center Coliseum14,082
| 2–1

|- align="center" bgcolor="#ffcccc"
| 1
| April 14
| @ Golden State
| L 96–123
| Leonard Gray (20)
| Leonard Gray (8)
| Watts, Brown (4)
| Oakland–Alameda County Coliseum Arena12,279
| 0–1
|- align="center" bgcolor="#ccffcc"
| 2
| April 16
| @ Golden State
| W 100–99
| Spencer Haywood (28)
| Spencer Haywood (15)
| Slick Watts (7)
| Oakland–Alameda County Coliseum Arena12,787
| 1–1
|- align="center" bgcolor="#ffcccc"
| 3
| April 17
| @ Golden State
| L 96–105
| Tommy Burleson (25)
| Tommy Burleson (11)
| Slick Watts (9)
| Seattle Center Coliseum14,082
| 1–2
|- align="center" bgcolor="#ccffcc"
| 4
| April 19
| Golden State
| W 111–94
| Fred Brown (37)
| Tommy Burleson (15)
| Slick Watts (10)
| Seattle Center Coliseum14,082
| 2–2
|- align="center" bgcolor="#ffcccc"
| 5
| April 22
| @ Golden State
| L 100–124
| three players tied (15)
| Tommy Burleson (8)
| Leonard Gray (5)
| Oakland–Alameda County Coliseum Arena12,787
| 2–3
|- align="center" bgcolor="#ffcccc"
| 6
| April 24
| Golden State
| L 96–105
| Slick Watts (24)
| Tommy Burleson (11)
| Slick Watts (11)
| Seattle Center Coliseum14,082
| 2–4

Player statistics

Season

Playoffs

Awards and records
 Spencer Haywood was selected to the All-NBA Second Team and represented the West in the 1975 NBA All-Star Game.
 Tommy Burleson was selected to the NBA All-Rookie First Team.

Transactions

Overview

Trades

References

Seattle
Seattle SuperSonics seasons